Dworkin or Dvorkin is a Jewish (Eastern Ashkenasic) surname originating from the Hebrew given name Deborah. In Slavic countries it is strictly masculine, with the feminine counterpart being Dworkina or Dvorkina. Notable people with the surname include:

Aaron Dworkin (born 1970), American musician and activist
Alexander Dvorkin, a sectologist, linked to Russian Orthodox Church
Andrea Dworkin (1946–2005), American feminist writer
Cora Dvorkin, Argentine physicist
Craig Dworkin, American poet and Professor of English
Dan Dworkin (born 1972), American screenwriter and television producer
David Dworkin (born 1934), American musician
Dorothy Dworkin (1889–1976), American nurse, businesswoman and philanthropist
Gerald Dworkin (born 1937), American legal philosopher
Howard Dvorkin, American finance expert
Jeffrey Dvorkin, American journalist
Judith Dvorkin (born 1930), American composer and librettist
Keith Dworkin, American playwright
Mark J. Dworkin (1946–2012), Canadian writer 
Ronald Dworkin (1931–2013), American legal philosopher
Hart–Dworkin debate
Ronald W. Dworkin, American anesthesiologist
 Maj. Gen.  (born 1936), Russian commanding officer, ballistic missiles designer, and statesman

See also
Dorkin

References

Russian-language surnames
Jewish surnames
Ashkenazi surnames
Russian-Jewish surnames